Leonardo Fernandes de Sá, O. Cist. was a Roman Catholic prelate who served as Bishop of Macau (1578–1597).

Biography
Leonardo Fernandes de Sá was born in Cartaxo, Portugal. He was ordained in the Order of Cistercians. On 27 Oct 1578 he was appointed during the papacy of Pope Gregory XIII as Bishop of Macau.
He arrived at Macau in 1581 replacing Melchior Carneiro, the Patriarch of Ethiopia, who was serving as administrator.
He served as Bishop of Macau until his death on 15 Sep 1597. The diocese was governed by Father Manuel de Aguiar from 1597–1599 and Miguel dos Santos from 1599–1607 until the arrival of João Pinto da Piedade.

References

External links
 
  

17th-century Roman Catholic bishops in China
Bishops appointed by Pope Gregory XIII
Cistercian bishops
1597 deaths